Adrianus "Ad" Dekkers (1 November 1953 – 29 July 2002) was a Dutch cyclist who was active between 1972 and 1983. He competed at the 1972 Summer Olympics in the 4 km team pursuit and finished in fifth place. Two years later he won one stage of the Olympia's Tour, finishing second in the overall race.

See also
 List of Dutch Olympic cyclists

References

1953 births
2002 deaths
Olympic cyclists of the Netherlands
Cyclists at the 1972 Summer Olympics
Dutch male cyclists
People from Udenhout
Cyclists from North Brabant